Khwaja Khizr Tomb is a maqbara located at Jatwara, Sonipat, National Capital Region, India. It was built by Ibrahim Lodi in the memory of Khwaja Khizr, the son of Darya Khan, during the period .

References 

Buildings and structures completed in 1524
Buildings and structures in Haryana
Islamic architecture
Architecture of the Lodi dynasty
Sonipat
Tombs in India
Tourist attractions in Haryana